The fourth season of Battle of the Blades premiered on September 22, 2013, as a part of CBC's fall line-up after a two-year hiatus.  Like previous seasons, this season showcases a lineup of 8 couples.

Ron MacLean returns as the show's host.  Former co-host Kurt Browning assumes judging duties on a new judging panel, along with Olympic figure skating gold medalist and season one champion Jamie Salé, and former NHL player and season two competitor P.J. Stock. This season does not feature rotating guest judges every week.  The show venue for this season continues to be at the MasterCard Centre in Etobicoke, Toronto, Ontario.

There are no Monday night results show this season; therefore, elimination takes place at the end of each Sunday night performance shows from Week 2 onwards.  The judges score and viewer votes from the previous week determine the bottom two couples on the current week's show, which are announced at the top of the programme.  The bottom two couples perform their new routines in the "Skate-Off" at the end of the episode after the couples who are safe have skated.  The judges would then score their performances and the couple with the lower judges score is eliminated.  The score for the remaining couple's performance would count as their score for the week.  The one-time use Judge's Save returned for this season.

Viewer voting this season is solely done on the show's official website, eliminating the telephone and texting options.  Each unregistered visitor gets one vote.  Registered visitors can earn additional votes by completing their profile and other activities and challenges on the website.

Casting
The official cast announcement were made from September 15 to September 20 on the show's website.  Along with the eight new ex-NHL hockey players, the female figure skating professionals were also announced; but the pairings of the two were only announced on the season premiere preview show, "Made in Canada", which aired on September 22.  Unlike the previous season, which introduced a female hockey player competitor, this season featured solely male hockey players, as per the first two seasons.

Of the eight female skaters, four were returning participants: season 1 & 2 first runner-up Shae-Lynn Bourne, season 1 second runner-up & season 3 first runner-up Marie-France Dubreuil, season 2 & 3 competitor Violetta Afanasieva, and season 3 competitor Marcy Hinzmann.  The four new female skaters are Oksana Kazakova, Sinead Kerr, Jessica Dubé, and Amanda Evora.

Couples

Scoring Chart
Red numbers indicate the couples with the lowest score for each week.
Green numbers indicate the couples with the highest score for each week.
 indicates the couple(s) eliminated that week.
 indicates the returning couple that finished in the bottom two the previous week, but won the Skate-Off.
 indicates the returning couple that was saved by the judges using "The Judges' Save" after being eliminated in the Skate-Off the same night.
 indicates the winning couple.
 indicates the runner-up couple.
 indicates the third-place couple.

a ^ Week 6 featured a double elimination.  Brian and Jessica were eliminated for being the bottom two couple losing the Skate-Off (against Mathieu and Marie-France).  Grant and Sinead were eliminated as the couple remaining (after the elimination of Brian and Jessica) that had the lowest judges score.
b ^ Skates in Week 7 were not scored by the judges.

Average chart

Individual scores & songs
Individual judges scores in charts below (given in parentheses) are listed in this order from left to right unless specified: Kurt Browning, Jamie Salé, P. J. Stock.

Week 1
Weekly Theme: Rock
Running order

Week 2
Weekly Theme: Suit and Tie: Dance Classics
Bottom Two Couples: Mike & Marcy, Vladimir & Oksana
Eliminated Couple: Mike & Marcy

Running order

Week 3
Weekly Theme: International Beats
Bottom Two Couples: Vladimir & Oksana, Mathieu & Marie-France
Eliminated Couple: Vladimir & Oksana

Running order

Week 4
Weekly Theme: Fan's Choice: The Great Canadian Songbook
Bottom Two Couples: Grant & Sinead, Anson & Shae-Lynn
Eliminated Couple: None (Anson & Shae-Lynn saved using the Judges' Save)

Running order

Week 5
Weekly Theme: Iconic Duos
Bottom Two Couples: Grant & Sinead, Anson & Shae-Lynn
Eliminated Couple: Anson & Shae-Lynn

Running order

Week 6
Weekly Theme: The Winter Olympics
Bottom Two Couples: Brian & Jessica, Mathieu & Marie-France
Eliminated Couples: Brian & Jessica (Skate-Off); Grant & Sinead (Lowest score of remaining couples)

Individual judges scores for Week 6 (given in parentheses) are listed in this order from left to right: David Pelletier, Jamie Salé, P. J. Stock.

Running order

Week 7
Weekly Theme: Final Three Couples
None of the skates in Week 7 were scored.
Running order

Weekly ratings
Weekly ratings and rankings are measured by BBM Canada, an audience measurement organization for Canadian television and radio broadcasting.  Weekly ranks are based on weeks starting on Monday and ending on Sunday.

References

External links
 Official website of Battle of the Blades

Season 04
2013 Canadian television seasons